The 2012 FEI Nations Cup Promotional League is the 2012 edition of the secondary international team Grand Prix show jumping competition run by the FEI.

European Promotional League

Standings 
A team of a country that belongs to one of the 2012 FEI Nations Cup teams can not earn points in this league. Teams who are part of one of the other Promotional Leagues also can not earn points in this league.

The second-placed to fourth-placed teams of the European Promotional League have the permission to start in the 2012 Promotional League Final.

Results

FEI Nations Cup of Belgium 
CSIO 4* – May 2, 2012 to May 6, 2012 – Lummen (Vlaams Feest van de Paardensport), 
Competition: Friday, May 4, 2012 – Start: 2:00 pm, prize money: 40 000 €

(Top 6 of 14 Teams)Grey penalties points do not count for the team result, in the second round only three riders per team are allowed to start.

FEI Nations Cup of Austria 
CSIO 4* – May 10, 2012 to May 13, 2012 – Linz (Linzer Pferdefestival), 
Competition: Friday, May 11, 2012; prize money: 30 000 €

(Top 7 of 15 Teams)Grey penalties points do not count for the team result, in the second round only three riders per team are allowed to start.

FEI Nations Cup of Denmark 
CSIO 4* – May 17, 2012 to May 20, 2012 – Copenhagen, 
Competition: Friday, May 18, 2012; prize money: 225 000 DKK

(Top 7 of 18 Teams)Grey penalties points do not count for the team result, in the second round only three riders per team are allowed to start.

FEI Nations Cup of Norway 
CSIO 3* – June 21, 2011 to June 24, 2012 – Drammen, 
Competition: Saturday, June 23, 2012

(Top 6 of 10 Teams)Grey penalties points do not count for the team result, in the second round only three riders per team are allowed to start.

FEI Nations Cup of Spain 
CSIO 5* Gijon – August 29, 2012 to September 3, 2012 – Gijon, 

Grey penalties points do not count for the team result.

Challengers League

Standings 
A team of a country that belongs to one of the 2012 FEI Nations Cup teams can not earn points in this league. Also teams who are part of one of the other Promotional Leagues also can not earn points in this league.

The best six results will be count for the final ranking. The first-placed to third-placed teams of the 2012 Challengers League will have the permission to start in the 2012 Promotional League Final.

Results

FEI Nations Cup of Belarus 
CSIO 2* – May 24, 2012 to May 27, 2012 – Minsk, 

Grey penalties points do not count for the team result, in the second round only three riders per team are allowed to start.

FEI Nations Cup of Portugal 
CSIO 4* – May 31, 2012 to June 3, 2012 – Lisbon, 
Competition: Friday, June 1, 2012 – Start: 6:00 pm

(Top 6 of 10 Teams)Grey penalties points do not count for the team result, in the second round only three riders per team are allowed to start.

FEI Nations Cup of Latvia 
CSIO 3* – June 28, 2012 to July 1, 2012 – Riga, 

(Top 4 of 7 Teams)Grey penalties points do not count for the team result, in the second round only three riders per team are allowed to start.

FEI Nations Cup of Poland 
CSIO 3* – July 5, 2012 to July 8, 2012 – Sopot, 
Competition: Friday, July 8, 2012 at 4:30 pm

(Top 6 of 8 Teams)Grey penalties points do not count for the team result.

FEI Nations Cup of Hungary 
CSIO 3*-W – July 12, 2012 to July 15, 2012 – Budapest, 
Competition: Friday, July 13, 2012, prize money: 26 000 €

(Top 6 of 12 Teams)Grey penalties points do not count for the team result.

FEI Nations Cup of Slovakia 
CSIO 3* – July 19, 2012 to July 22, 2012 – Bratislava, 
Competition: Friday, July 20, 2012, prize money: 24 000 €

(Top 6 of 12 Teams)Grey penalties points do not count for the team result.

FEI Nations Cup of Lithuania 
CSIO 3* – August 10, 2012 to August 12, 2012 – Vazgaikiemis, 
Competition: Sunday, August 12, 2012 – Start: 3:00 pm, prize money: € 30,000

Grey penalties points do not count for the team result, in the second round only three riders per team are allowed to start.

FEI Nations Cup of Russia 
CSIO 5* – August 23, 2012 to August 26, 2012 – Moscow, 
Competition: Friday, August 23, 2012 – Start: 5:00 pm, prize money: € 80,000

Grey penalties points do not count for the team result, in the second round only three riders per team are allowed to start.

FEI Nations Cup of Greece 
CSIO 2* – September 13, 2012 to September 16, 2012 – Markopoulo Olympic Equestrian Centre, Markopoulo Mesogaias, 
cancelled

North and South American League

Standings 
The best-placed team of the 2012 North and South American League, Canada, have the permission to start in the 2012 Promotional League Final. 

A team of a country that belongs to one of the 2012 FEI Nations Cup teams can not earn points in this league. Teams who are part of one of the other Promotional Leagues also can not earn points in this league.

Results

FEI Nations Cup of Canada (2011) 

CSIO 5* – September 7, 2011 to September 11, 2011 – Spruce Meadows, Calgary, 
Competition: Saturday, September 10, 2011 at 2:00 pm

(Top 5 of 10 Teams)

FEI Nations Cup of Argentina (2011) 
CSIO 2*-W – November 23, 2011 to November 27, 2011 – Haras El Capricho, Capilla del Señor, 
Competition: Friday, November 25, 2011 – Start: 3:30 pm, prize money: US$ 12,000

(Top 4 of 7 Teams)

FEI Nations Cup of the United States 
CSIO 4* – February 29, 2012 to March 4, 2012 – Wellington, Florida, 
Competition: Friday, March 2, 2012 – Start: 7:00 pm, prize money: US$ 75,000

(Top 6 of 10 Teams)

FEI Nations Cup of Brazil 
CSIO 4*-W – May 3, 2012 to May 6, 2012 – Porto Alegre, 
Competition: Friday, May 4, 2012 – Start: 3:15 pm

(Top 4 of 6 Teams)

2012 Promotional League Final  
The 2012 Promotional League Final, the fourth Promotional League Final, was held in Barcelona, Spain, on September 23, 2012 at 3:30 pm. The competition was held during the 2012 CSIO Barcelona, a (CSIO 5* horse show. A purse of € 90,000 was offered at the Promotional League Final, with each of the seven competing teams receiving a share.

The winning team is qualified for the League "Europe I" of the 2013 Furusiyya FEI Nations Cup.

External links 
 FEI Nations Cup Promotional Leagues
 2012 FEI Nations Cup™ Series Rules: Mark-up Version, Clean Version

Sources 

 Promotional League
2012 in Spanish sport
Equestrian sports competitions in Spain